Lewis Lempereur-Palmer (born December 1996) is a young English actor. He has appeared in The Khomenko Family Chronicles staged at the Royal Court Theatre in 2007. His performance as a Ukrainian boy suffering from ill health owing to the fallout from the Chernobyl disaster won the praise of London's theatre critics, with The Stage calling it "a fantastically assured performance".

References

External links
 

Living people
1996 births
English male child actors
21st-century English male actors
Place of birth missing (living people)
English male stage actors
English male film actors